is a Japanese professional golfer who plays on the Japan Golf Tour.

Shigenaga has played on the Japan Golf Tour since 2013. He won his first tournament at the 2018 Token Homemate Cup.

Professional wins (1)

Japan Golf Tour wins (1)

References

External links

Japanese male golfers
Japan Golf Tour golfers
Sportspeople from Kumamoto Prefecture
1988 births
Living people